MightySat-2.1, also known as P99-1 or Sindri was a small spacecraft developed by the Air Force Research Laboratory to test advanced technologies in imaging, communications, and spacecraft bus components in space.

Design 

MightySat II.1 was manufactured by Spectrum Astro in a modular approach, using, e.g., VME-based subsystems, and a planar payload deck for small experimental payloads. The satellite measured 0.67m x 0.83m x 0.86m (WxLxH) and had a launch weight of 123.7 kg (Bus Mass: 87.1 kg). Power was provided by 2-axis articulated Si solar arrays with a designed end-of-life power output of 330 W. The attitude determination and control subsystem featured a 3-axis zero-momentum-bias reaction wheel assembly with a Sun sensor, a star tracker and inertial measurement units, delivering an attitude jitter of 15.7 arcsec/sec, and pointing accuracy and knowledge of 648 and 540 arcsec, respectively. The communication was compatible with the US Air Force space-ground link system with data rates of 1 Mbit/s for payload/experiments data downlink, 2.0 kbit/s for command uplink, and 20 kbit/s for telemetry downlink. Computing and data handling was done by a RAD6000 CPU @ 20 MIPS with an IEEE VME backplane 128 MByte CPU RAM, and a 21.6 MBytes/sec transfer rate, and a 2 Gbit solid state recorder for science data. Among its 10 experiments was a Fourier transform hyperspectral imager.

Mission 

MightSat II.1 was launched on July 19, 2000, with a Minotaur I. It deorbited in November 2002 due to natural decay of its orbit, exceeding more than twice its nominal lifetime.

Payload and experimental instruments

Stand-alone experiments/sensors 
 Kestrel Fourier transform (visible) hyperspectral imager
 Quad TMS320C40 (QC40) floating point digital signal processor
 DARPA-Aerospace sponsored PicoSat launcher assembly
 Shape memory alloy thermoelastic tailoring experiment
 Starfire optical reflectors for use with Kirtland's Starfire Optical Range

Engineering/experimental bus components
 NRL miniature SGLS transponder (known as the NSX)
 Multi-functional composite bus structure
 Solar array concentrator
 Advanced composite solar array substrate
 Solar array flexible interconnect

References 

Satellites of the United States Air Force
Spacecraft launched by Minotaur rockets
Spacecraft launched in 2000
Spacecraft which reentered in 2002